The 2012 United States presidential election in Tennessee took place on November 6, 2012, as part of the 2012 United States presidential election in which all 50 states plus the District of Columbia participated. Tennessee voters chose 11 electors to represent them in the Electoral College via a popular vote pitting incumbent Democratic President Barack Obama and his running mate, Vice President Joe Biden, against Republican challenger and former Massachusetts Governor Mitt Romney and his running mate, Congressman Paul Ryan.

Romney easily carried Tennessee's 11 electoral votes, winning 59.48% of the vote in the state to Obama's 39.08%. Romney's 20.40% margin of victory was the strongest performance by any presidential candidate in the state since Richard Nixon's 1972 landslide. Tennessee has not voted for a Democratic presidential nominee since 1996, when Bill Clinton won the state and many other states of the South, and the Volunteer State has not given a majority to a Democratic nominee since fellow Southerner Jimmy Carter carried it in 1976. Thus, Tennessee has been seen as part of the modern-day red wall in the 21st century. After 1996, the state has been growing more Republican with each election.

As consistent with the rest of the country, Obama carried heavily populated and diverse counties. The largest county, Shelby, was won by Obama by a 26.08% margin due to it being home to Memphis, Tennessee's largest city. In addition, the home of the state capital of Nashville, Davidson County, went to Obama by 18.58%. Hardeman and Haywood counties, both low-populated suburbs of Memphis, also went to Obama due to their high African American populations (42.2% and 50.6%, respectively). However, rural areas – including areas in the northwestern portion of the state that had long favored Democratic candidates – saw heavy margins for Romney, allowing him to offset Obama's wins in large cities. The eastern region of the state in Appalachia, some of the most historically Republican and Unionist counties in the country, saw margins of over 70% for the Republican ticket.

Romney also flipped two counties, Houston and Jackson, to the Republican column. Both of these majority-white counties had been Democratic strongholds with their strong ties to secessionism: they had each only voted for a Republican presidential nominee once prior to this election, in 1928 and 1920, respectively.

As of 2020, this is the most recent election in which Hardeman County was won by the Democratic presidential nominee. This is also the first and only time that a Democratic president has won re-election without carrying Tennessee.

Primaries

Democratic
The 2012 democratic primary in Tennessee took place on Super Tuesday, March 6, 2012, with Barack Obama receiving 80,355 (88.5%) votes. Other candidates received a combined total of 10,411 (11.5%) votes. Tennessee had a total of 91 delegates to the 2012 Democratic National Convention,  of which 82 were pledged to presidential contenders depending on the popular vote. The remaining 9 super-delegates were unbound.

Republican

The Republican primary took place on Super Tuesday, March 6, 2012.

Tennessee has 58 delegates to the 2012 Republican National Convention. Three superdelegates are unbound. 27 delegates are awarded by congressional district, 3 delegates for each district. If a candidate wins two-thirds of the vote in a district, he takes all 3 delegates there; if not, delegates are split 2-to-1 between the top two candidates. Another 28 delegates are awarded to the candidate who wins two-thirds of the vote statewide, or allocated proportionately among candidates winning at least 20% of the vote if no one gets two-thirds.

Former Senator from Pennsylvania Rick Santorum won the primary with a plurality, carrying 37.11% of the vote and all but four counties, awarding him 29 delegates. Former Massachusetts Governor and eventual nominee, Mitt Romney, came second with 28.06% of the vote and 19 delegates. He carried only three counties: Davidson, Loudon, and Williamson. Former Speaker of the House of Representatives, Newt Gingrich of neighboring Georgia, came third with 23.96% of the vote and 9 delegates, carrying only the county of Marion. Representative from Texas Ron Paul received 9.04% of the vote and all other candidates received under 1% of the vote.

Results

General election

Results

By county

Counties that flipped from Democratic to Republican 

 Houston (largest city: Erin)
 Jackson (largest town: Gainesboro)

By congressional district 
Mitt Romney swept the state and carried seven of the state's nine congressional districts, all represented by Republicans. Barack Obama carried the state's two congressional districts, the 5th and 9th, anchored by the two largest cities of Nashville and Memphis, respectively.

See also 
 2012 Republican Party presidential debates and forums
 2012 Republican Party presidential primaries
 Results of the 2012 Republican Party presidential primaries
 Tennessee Republican Party
 2012 Democratic Party presidential primaries

References

External links
The Green Papers for Tennessee (Republican)
The Green Papers for Tennessee (Democratic)
The Green Papers: Major state elections in chronological order

2012
United States President
Tennessee